HMS Duncan was the lead ship of the six-ship  of Royal Navy pre-dreadnought battleships. The Duncan-class battleships were armed with a main battery of four  guns and they were broadly similar to the s, though of a slightly reduced displacement and thinner armour layout. Duncan was built between her keel laying in July 1899 and her completion in October 1903.

Duncan served with the Mediterranean Fleet until 1905, at which she was transferred to the Channel Fleet. Duncan served with the Atlantic Fleet from 1907 to late 1908, when she was transferred back to the Mediterranean Fleet. In 1912, she was transferred to the Home Fleet when the Mediterranean Fleet was reorganized into a squadron of it, and the next year she became a gunnery training ship. After the outbreak of the First World War in August 1914, Duncan was being refitted; once she returned to service in September, she joined her sister ships on the Northern Patrol.

In 1915, Duncan was transferred to the 9th Cruiser Squadron based in the central Atlantic. Later that year, she was reassigned to the 2nd Detached Squadron to support the Italian Royal Navy, and in 1916 she was sent to Salonika, Greece. There, she took part in operations against Greek royalists who opposed entering the war on the side of the Allies. Duncan returned to Britain in February 1917 and was converted into a barracks ship before being broken up for scrap in 1920.

Design

The Russian ships were fast second-class battleships, so William Henry White, the British Director of Naval Construction, designed the Duncan class to match the purported top speed of the Russian vessels. The Duncans proved to be disappointments in service, owing to their reduced defensive characteristics, though they were still markedly superior to the Peresvets they had been built to counter.

The Duncan-class battleships displaced  normally and up to  fully loaded. Her crew numbered 720 officers and ratings. The Duncan-class ships were powered by a pair of 4-cylinder triple-expansion engines that drove two screws, with steam provided by twenty-four Belleville boilers. The boilers were trunked into two funnels located amidships. This made Duncan and her sisters the fastest battleships in the world for several years.

Duncan had a main battery of four  40-calibre guns mounted in twin-gun turrets fore and aft. The ships also mounted a secondary battery of twelve  45-calibre guns mounted in casemates, in addition to ten 12-pounder  guns and six 3-pounder  guns for defence against torpedo boats. As was customary for battleships of the period, she was also equipped with four  torpedo tubes submerged in the hull.

Her conning tower had 12-inch-thick sides.

Operational history

Pre-World War I
HMS Duncan was laid down by Thames Ironworks and Shipbuilding Company, Leamouth, on 10 July 1899, and launched on 21 March 1901. She left the Victoria Dock for Chatham in May 1902, for armament and trials, and was completed in October 1903. HMS Duncan commissioned at Chatham Dockyard on 8 October for Mediterranean Fleet service. She transferred to the Channel Fleet in February 1905. On 26 September that year, she collided with the battleship  at Lerwick, suffering hull damage including a hole in her side below the waterline, rudder damage, and the loss of her sternwalk. She suffered another mishap on 23 July 1906, when she grounded off Lundy Island during unsuccessful operations to salvage the battleship .

Duncan transferred to the Atlantic Fleet in February 1907, and underwent a refit at Gibraltar from November to February 1908. On 1 December, Duncan transferred to the Mediterranean Fleet to serve as Second Flagship. She underwent a refit at Malta in 1909. Under a fleet reorganisation on 1 May 1912, the Mediterranean Fleet became the 4th Battle Squadron, Home Fleet, and changed its base from Malta to Gibraltar; Duncan thus became a unit of the squadron at Gibraltar. On 27 May 1913, Duncan recommissioned at Chatham with a nucleus crew and was assigned to the 6th Battle Squadron in the Second Fleet at Portsmouth, where she served as a gunnery training ship in the commissioned reserve. She began a refit at Chatham in May 1914.

World War I

Duncan was still undergoing her refit when World War I began in August 1914. However, plans also existed for the 6th Battle Squadron to be assigned to the Grand Fleet, and, when the war began, the Commander-in-Chief, Grand Fleet, Admiral Sir John Jellicoe, requested that Duncan and her four surviving sister ships (Albemarle, Cornwallis, Exmouth, and Russell) be assigned to the 3rd Battle Squadron in the Grand Fleet for patrol duties to make up for the Grand Fleet's shortage of cruisers. Accordingly, the 6th Battle Squadron was temporarily abolished, and, upon completion of her refit in September 1914, Duncan joined the 3rd Battle Squadron at Scapa Flow, where she joined the Grand Fleet's cruisers on duty in the Northern Patrol.

The following day, the German fleet raided Yarmouth; at the time, Duncan and the rest of the 3rd Squadron were dispersed on the Northern Patrol, and were thus unavailable during the German attack. On 13 November 1914, the King Edward VII-class ships returned to the Grand Fleet, but Duncan and her sister ships stayed in the Channel Fleet, where they reconstituted the 6th Battle Squadron on 14 November 1914. This squadron was given a mission of bombarding German submarine bases on the coast of Belgium, and was based at Portland, although it transferred to Dover immediately on 14 November 1914. However, due a lack of antisubmarine defenses at Dover, particularly after the harbour's anti-submarine boom was swept away in a gale, the squadron returned to Portland on 19 November 1914.

The 6th Battle Squadron returned to Dover in December 1914, then transferred to Sheerness on 30 December 1914 to relieve the 5th Battle Squadron there in guarding against a German invasion of the United Kingdom. Between January and May 1915, the 6th Battle Squadron was dispersed. Duncan left the squadron in February 1915 to be reduced to reserve for a refit at Chatham that lasted until July 1915. She recommissioned at Chatham on 19 July 1915 and was attached to the 9th Cruiser Squadron on the Finisterre-Azores-Madeira Station. In August 1915, Duncan transferred to the 2nd Detached Squadron in the Adriatic Sea. The squadron had been organized in May 1915 to reinforce the Italian Navy against the Austro-Hungarian Navy after Italy declared war on Austria-Hungary. Duncan was based at Taranto, Italy, during this service. Admiral Paolo Thaon di Revel, the Italian naval chief of staff, believed that the threat from Austro-Hungarian submarines and naval mines in the narrow waters of the Adriatic was too serious for him to use the fleet for active operations. Instead, Revel decided to implement a blockade at the relatively safer southern end of the Adriatic with the main fleet, while smaller vessels, such as the MAS boats, conducted raids on Austro-Hungarian ships and installations.

In June 1916, Duncan transferred to the 3rd Detached Squadron in the Aegean Sea, based at Salonika. At the time, Greece was ruled by the pro-German Constantine I, who had decided to remain neutral. The Entente powers had landed troops in Salonika in 1915, which was a source of tension between France and Greece. The issue came to a head in August 1916 when a pro-Entente group launched a coup against the monarchy in the Noemvriana. Starting in December 1916, she participated in operations against the Greek royalists, beginning with the landing of Royal Marines at Athens on 1 December 1916 to coerce Constantine to abdicate. The British and French troops were defeated by the Greek Army and armed civilians and were forced to withdraw to their ships, after which the British and French fleet imposed a blockade of the royalist-controlled parts of the country. She returned to the Adriatic Squadron in January 1917. In February, Duncan returned to the United Kingdom and paid off at Sheerness to provide crews for antisubmarine vessels. She was in reserve at Sheerness until April, when she moved to Chatham for a refit. Upon completion of her refit in January 1918, she remained in reserve at Chatham, serving as an accommodation ship. Duncan was placed on the disposal list in March 1919, and was sold for scrapping to Stanlee Shipbreaking Company Limited, in Dover, on 18 February 1920. She was towed to Dover for scrapping in June 1920.

Notes

References

Further reading
 
 
 
 

 

Duncan-class battleships
Ships built in Leamouth
1901 ships
World War I battleships of the United Kingdom